Bossé can be:

A common name of African trees in the genus Guarea

A surname. Notable people named Bossé include:
Anne-Élisabeth Bossé (born 1984), Canadian actress 
Georges Bossé, Canadian politician
Joseph Guillaume Bossé, Canadian politician
Joseph-Noël Bossé, Canadian politician
Steve Bossé, Canadian mixed martial artist